Future Miracles is the debut album by the British group The Ladder. All of the songs on the album were former FM songs that were never recorded by that band.

Track listing

 "Like Lovers Do" – 4:38 (Steve Overland/Chris Overland)
 "Closer to Your Heart" – 4:58 (S. Overland/C. Overland/Merv Goldsworthy/Pete Jupp)
 "Do You Love Me Enough" – 4:35 (S. Overland/Jupp)
 "Dangerous" – 6:05 (S. Overland/C. Overland)
 "Baby Blue" – 4:17 (S. Overland/Goldsworthy/Jupp)
 "All I Ever Really Wanted" – 4:07 (S. Overland/Jupp)
 "Time For Changes" – 4:16 (S. Overland/Jupp)
 "The Angels Cried" – 6:21 (S. Overland/Jupp)
 "Say It Like It Is" – 4:20 (S. Overland/C. Overland)
 "When Tomorrow Comes" – 4:40 (S. Overland/C. Overland)
 "Too Bad" – 4:07 (S. Overland/C. Overland/Jupp)
Track listing for the Asian version, the European version (Escape Music ESM109) omits track 8.

Personnel
Steve Overland – lead and backing vocals
Pete Jupp – drums and percussion
Bob Skeat – bass guitar
Vinny Burns – guitars
Steve Morris - guitars and keyboards

Production
Executive Producer – Khalil Turk
Mixing – Corey Macfadyen
Engineer – Steve Morris

External links
Heavy Harmonies review
GRTR review
melodicrock.com review

The Ladder (band) albums
2004 debut albums